Brian G. Cartwright (born 1948) is a senior lawyer and former astrophysicist. From 2006 to 2009 he was General Counsel for the Securities and Exchange Commission of the USA.

Career

On January 3, 2006, the SEC Commission Chair Christopher Cox officially appointed ex-Latham & Watkins partner Brian G. Cartwright as its top lawyer, replacing Giovanni Prezioso.

Mr. Cartwright holds a Juris Doctor from Harvard Law School, where he was president of the Harvard Law Review and winner of the Sears Prize, given every year to the first and second-year students with the highest grade point averages. He served as law clerk to U.S. Supreme Court Justice Sandra Day O’Connor from 1981 to 1982.

Before becoming a lawyer, Mr. Cartwright was an astrophysicist graduating from Yale University, he earned a Ph.D. in physics from the University of Chicago and worked as a research physicist at the University of California at Berkeley's space sciences laboratory. He published numerous articles in scholarly journals including the Astrophysical Journal.

Personal life
Brian Cartwright is married with three grown sons

See also 
List of law clerks of the Supreme Court of the United States (Seat 8)

References

1948 births
Living people
American lawyers
Harvard Law School alumni
Law clerks of the Supreme Court of the United States